Edward A. Johnson is a Canadian ecologist.  His research focuses on the contact between geosciences and ecology.

Johnson is currently a professor of biological sciences at the University of Calgary, located in Alberta. He was formerly the director of the Biogeoscience Institute (BGI) at the university, which promotes research in the Canadian rockies and surrounding areas, where he is involved in research programs.

His research aims to incorporate the concept of natural disturbance into plant community organisation and dynamics. E. A. Johnson's applied interests include but are not limited to global climate change, conservation biology, and ecosystem and fire management.

Johnson is a member of the National Science Foundation (NSF) Community Surface Dynamics Modeling System, which is a national effort that aims to coordinate surface dynamic modelling of the Earth's surface. He is also a member of the Natural Sciences and Engineering Research Council (NSERC) Centres of Excellence in Sustainable Forest Management, NSERC Geomatics for Informed Decisions (GEOIDE), PAGSE (Royal Society of Canada), and he serves as the editor-in-chief of the journal Bulletin of the Ecological Society of America.

E. A. Johnson has published four books that pertain to his areas of ecological interests. This includes the book titled Fire and Vegetation Dynamics which was published in 1992, which explores the dynamics of fires in the North American boreal forest. He published Forest Fires: Behavior and Ecological Effects in 2001. In 2005, he published Environmental Education and Advocacy  which highlights the changing perspectives of ecology and education. In 2007 Johnson published Plant Disturbance Ecology: the Process and the Response.

E.A. Johnson received the 1986 W.S. Cooper Award from the Ecological Society of America.

Bibliography
Johnson, E.A. and K. Miyanishi (eds.) 2007. Plant Disturbance Ecology: The Process and the Response. Academic Press, San Diego.
Johnson, E. A. and M. J. Mappin (2005). Ecological education and environmental advocacy, Cambridge University Press. 
Johnson, E.A. and K. Miyanishi (eds.) 2001. Forest Fires: Behavior and Ecological Effects. Academic Press, San Diego.
Johnson, E.A. 1992. Fire and Vegetation Dynamics. Cambridge University Press.

References

External links
 
 Biogeoscience Institute biography
 Biogeoscience Institute

Canadian ecologists
Living people
Year of birth missing (living people)
Fellows of the Ecological Society of America
Academic staff of the University of Calgary